Gentle Death is a 1993 album by Excessive Force, a KMFDM side project. On November 6, 2007, this album was re-released with remastered audio as well as the "Blitzkrieg" single as bonus tracks.

Track listing

Personnel
 Sascha Konietzko – vocals, programming, and drums
 Günter Schulz – guitar (2, 8, 9, 12, 13)
 Mark Durante - guitar (3-5)
 En Esch - guitar (6)
 Liz Torres – vocals (1, 6, 7, 11)
 George Booker – vocals (6)
 Evie Camp – vocals (3, 4)
 Meechie Faire – vocals (5)

Reception
The Trouser Press Guide to '90s Rock wrote that it "plays like a half finished KMFDM album".

References

1993 albums
Excessive Force albums